Graméu is one of six parishes (administrative divisions)  in Cabranes, a municipality within the province and autonomous community of Asturias, in northern Spain. 

Villages
 Xiranes (population 24)
 Graméu  (population 16)

References

Parishes in Cabranes